Alexander I (Alek'sandre I) (died 1389), of the Bagrationi dynasty, was king of western Georgian 
kingdom of Imereti from 1387 to 1389. Prior to that, he was eristavi ("duke") of Imereti under the authority of the kings of Georgia.

Alexander was born sometime after 1358 into the family of Bagrat I, then duke (and ex-king) of Imereti, and his wife, a Jaqeli atabeg of Samtskhe. On his father's death in 1372, Alexander was appointed by King Bagrat V of Georgia as duke of Imereti. In 1387, he took advantage of Timur's invasions of Georgia and proclaimed himself king of Imereti at the Gelati Monastery, but the city of Kutaisi remained in the hands of Bagrat V's loyalists and the dukes of Mingrelia, Guria, Abkhazia, and Svaneti refused to join him. Alexander succeeded in seizing several fortresses in Imereti, but Kutaisi remained outside his control. He died in 1389 and was succeeded by his brother George I.  

Alexander was married to a certain Ana Orbeliani. He had two children:

 Prince Demetrius (died 1455), Duke of Imereti;
 Princess Tamar (died ), wife of Alexander I of Georgia.

References

Kings of Imereti
14th-century monarchs in Europe
Bagrationi dynasty of the Kingdom of Imereti
Eastern Orthodox monarchs
1389 deaths
14th-century people from Georgia (country)